Noranda may refer to:
Noranda (mining company)
Noranda Caldera, an Archean caldera in Canada
Noranda, Western Australia, a suburb of Perth
Noranda, Quebec, a former city in Canada: see Rouyn-Noranda